Lars Onsager (November 27, 1903 – October 5, 1976) was an American physical chemist and  theoretical physicist.  He held the Gibbs Professorship of Theoretical Chemistry at Yale University. He was awarded the Nobel Prize in Chemistry in 1968.

Education and early life 
Lars Onsager was born in Kristiania (now Oslo), Norway. His father was a lawyer. After completing secondary school in Oslo, he attended the Norwegian Institute of Technology (NTH) in Trondheim, graduating as a chemical engineer in 1925.

Career and research
In 1925 he arrived at a correction to the Debye-Hückel theory of electrolytic solutions, to specify Brownian movement of ions in solution, and during 1926 published it. He traveled to Zürich, where Peter Debye was teaching, and confronted Debye, telling him his theory was wrong. He impressed Debye so much that he was invited to become Debye's assistant at the Eidgenössische Technische Hochschule (ETH), where he remained until 1928.

Johns Hopkins University
In 1928 he went to the United States to take a faculty position at the Johns Hopkins University in Baltimore, Maryland. At JHU he had to teach freshman classes in chemistry, and it quickly became apparent that, while he was a genius at developing theories in physical chemistry, he had little talent for teaching. He was dismissed by JHU after one semester.

Brown University
On leaving JHU, he accepted a position (involving the teaching of statistical mechanics to graduate students in chemistry) at Brown University in Providence, Rhode Island, where it became clear that he was no better at teaching advanced students than freshmen, but he made significant contributions to statistical mechanics and thermodynamics. His graduate student Raymond Fuoss worked under him and eventually joined him on the Yale chemistry faculty. In 1933, when the Great Depression limited Brown's ability to support a faculty member who was only useful as a researcher and not a teacher, he was let go by Brown, being hired after a trip to Europe by Yale University, where he remained for most of the rest of his life, retiring in 1972.

His research at Brown was concerned mainly with the effects on diffusion of temperature gradients, and produced the Onsager reciprocal relations, a set of equations published in 1929 and, in an expanded form, in 1931, in statistical mechanics whose importance went unrecognized for many years. However, their value became apparent during the decades following World War II, and by 1968 they were considered important enough to gain Onsager that year's Nobel Prize in Chemistry.  In 1933, just before taking up the position at Yale, Onsager traveled to Austria to visit electrochemist Hans Falkenhagen. He met Falkenhagen's sister-in-law, Margrethe Arledter. They were married on September 7, 1933, and had three sons and a daughter.

Yale University
At Yale, an embarrassing situation occurred: he had been hired as a postdoctoral fellow, but it was discovered that he had never received a Ph.D. While he had submitted an outline of his work in reciprocal relations to the Norwegian Institute of Technology, they had decided it was too incomplete to qualify as a doctoral dissertation. He was told that he could submit one of his published papers to the Yale faculty as a dissertation, but insisted on doing a new research project instead. His dissertation laid the mathematical background for his interpretation of deviations from Ohm’s law in weak electrolytes. It dealt with the solutions of the Mathieu equation of period 4 pi and certain related functions and was beyond the comprehension of the chemistry and physics faculty. Only when some members of the mathematics department, including the chairman, insisted that the work was good enough that they would grant the doctorate if the chemistry department would not, was he granted a Ph.D. in chemistry in 1935. Even before the dissertation was finished, he was appointed assistant professor in 1934, and promoted to associate professor in 1940. He quickly showed at Yale the same traits he had at JHU and Brown: he produced brilliant theoretical research, but was incapable of giving a lecture at a level that a student (even a graduate student) could comprehend. He was also unable to direct the research of graduate students, except for the occasional outstanding one.

During the late 1930s, Onsager researched the dipole theory of dielectrics, making improvements for another topic that had been studied by Peter Debye. However, when he submitted his paper to a journal that Debye edited in 1936, it was rejected. Debye would not accept Onsager's ideas until after World War II. During the 1940s, Onsager studied the statistical-mechanical theory of phase transitions in solids, deriving a mathematically elegant theory which was enthusiastically received. In what is widely considered a tour de force of mathematical physics, he obtained the exact solution for the two dimensional Ising model in zero field in 1944.

In 1960 he was awarded an honorary degree, doctor techn. honoris causa, at the Norwegian Institute of Technology, later part of Norwegian University of Science and Technology.

In 1945, Onsager was naturalized as an American citizen, and the same year he was awarded the title of J. Willard Gibbs Professor of Theoretical Chemistry. This was particularly appropriate because Onsager, like Willard Gibbs, had been involved primarily in the application of mathematics to problems in physics and chemistry and, in a sense, could be considered to be continuing in the same areas Gibbs had pioneered.
In 1947, he was elected to the National Academy of Sciences, the American Academy of Arts and Sciences in 1949, and in 1950 he joined the ranks of Alpha Chi Sigma.

After World War II, Onsager researched new topics of interest. 
He proposed a theoretical explanation of the superfluid properties of liquid helium in 1949; two years later the physicist Richard Feynman independently proposed the same theory. He also worked on the theories of liquid crystals and the electrical properties of ice. While on a Fulbright scholarship to the University of Cambridge, he worked on the magnetic properties of metals. He developed important ideas on the quantization of magnetic flux in metals. He was awarded the Lorentz Medal in 1958, Willard Gibbs Award in 1962, and the Nobel Prize in Chemistry in 1968. He was elected a member of the American Philosophical Society in 1959 and a Foreign Member of the Royal Society (ForMemRS) in 1975.

After Yale

In 1972 Onsager retired from Yale and became emeritus. He then became a member of the Center for Theoretical Studies, University of Miami, and was appointed Distinguished University Professor of Physics. At the University of Miami he remained active in guiding and inspiring postdoctoral students as his teaching skills, although not his lecturing skills, had improved during the course of his career. He developed interests in semiconductor physics, biophysics and radiation chemistry. However, his death came before he could produce any breakthroughs comparable to those of his earlier years.

Personal life
He remained in Florida until his death from an aneurysm in Coral Gables, Florida in 1976. Onsager was buried next to John Gamble Kirkwood at New Haven's Grove Street Cemetery. While Kirkwood's tombstone has a long list of awards and positions, including the American Chemical Society Award in Pure Chemistry, the Richards Medal, and the Lewis Award, Onsager's tombstone, in its original form, simply said "Nobel Laureate". When Onsager's wife Gretel died in 1991 and was buried there, his children added an asterisk after "Nobel Laureate," and "*etc." in the lower right corner of the stone.

Legacy   
The Norwegian Institute of Technology established the Lars Onsager Lecture and The Lars Onsager Professorship in 1993 to award outstanding scientists in the scientific fields of Lars Onsager; Chemistry, Physics and Mathematics. The American Physical Society established Lars Onsager Prize in statistical physics in 1993. In 1997 his sons and daughter donated his scientific works and professional belongings to NTNU (before 1996 NTH) in Trondheim, Norway as his alma mater.  These are now organized as The Lars Onsager Archive at the Gunnerus Library in Trondheim.

See also

Lattice density functional theory (1944) solution to a two-dimensional (2D) lattice problem

References

External links

 Lars Onsager papers (MS 794). Manuscripts and Archives, Yale University Library. 
The Lars Onsager Lecture and Professorship (Norwegian  University of Science And Technology)
The Lars Onsager Archive at Universitetsbiblioteket/Gunnerus Library in Trondheim. (Norwegian  University of Science And Technology)
The Onsager Committee (Norwegian  University of Science And Technology)
The Lars Onsager Lecture and The Lars Onsager Professorship (Norwegian  University of Science And Technology).
The Motion of Ions: Principles and Concepts (Lars Onsager's  Nobel Lecture)

1903 births
1976 deaths
20th-century American physicists
American Nobel laureates
American physical chemists
Brown University faculty
Engineers from Oslo
Fellows of the American Physical Society
Foreign Members of the Royal Society
Lorentz Medal winners
Mathematical physicists
Members of the American Philosophical Society
Members of the Royal Swedish Academy of Sciences
Members of the United States National Academy of Sciences
National Medal of Science laureates
Nobel laureates in Chemistry
Norwegian emigrants to the United States
Norwegian Institute of Technology alumni
Norwegian Nobel laureates
Theoretical physicists
Thermodynamicists
Yale University alumni
Yale University faculty
Burials at Grove Street Cemetery